Coal Nunatak is a flat-topped rock mass with steep cliffs facing south, standing  southwest of Corner Cliffs on the southeast coast of Alexander Island, Antarctica. It was first seen from the air by Lincoln Ellsworth on November 23, 1935, and mapped from photos obtained on that flight by W.L.G. Joerg. Observed from the northwest (the direction from which Ellsworth photographed this nunatak), only the summit protrudes above the coastal ice, and it was uncertain whether this was a peak on Alexander Island or an island in George VI Sound. Its true nature was determined by the Falkland Islands Dependencies Survey (FIDS) who visited and surveyed this nunatak in 1949. So named by FIDS because thin lenses of coal occur there.

References 

Nunataks of Alexander Island